The Jacob Stanton House is a historic house in Winchester, Massachusetts, United States.  It is a -story wood-frame house with a gabled front portico supported by two-story smooth columns.  The main facade and the gable end are finished in flushboarding, and the second-story balcony features an ironwork railing.  The house was built c. 1840 by Deacon Nathan Brooks Johnson, a local blacksmith who may have made the balcony railings.  It is Winchester's only high-style temple-front Greek Revival house.  After Johnson's death it was purchased by Jacob Stanton, who built the Brown & Stanton Block in downtown Winchester.

The house was listed on the National Register of Historic Places in 1989.

See also
National Register of Historic Places listings in Winchester, Massachusetts

References

Houses on the National Register of Historic Places in Winchester, Massachusetts
Houses in Winchester, Massachusetts
Greek Revival architecture in Massachusetts